The Vienna Central Cemetery is one of the largest cemeteries in the world by number of interred, and is the most well-known cemetery among Vienna's nearly 50 cemeteries. The cemetery's name is descriptive of its significance as Vienna's biggest cemetery, not of its geographic location, as it is not in the city center of the Austrian capital, but on the southern outskirts, in the outer city district of Simmering.

History and description
Unlike many others, the Vienna Central Cemetery is not one that has evolved slowly. The decision to establish a new, big cemetery for Vienna came in 1863 when it became clear that – due to industrialization – the city's population would eventually increase to such an extent that the existing communal cemeteries would prove to be insufficient. City leaders expected that Vienna, then capital of the large Austro-Hungarian Empire, would grow to four million inhabitants by the end of the 20th century, as no-one foresaw the Empire's collapse in 1918. The city council therefore assigned an area significantly outside of the city's borders and of such large dimension, that it would suffice for a long time to come. They decided in 1869 that a flat area in Simmering should be the site of the future Central Cemetery. The cemetery was designed in 1870; according to the plans of the Frankfurt landscape architects Karl Jonas Mylius and Alfred Friedrich Bluntschli who were awarded for their project per angusta ad augusta (from dire to sublime).

The cemetery was opened on All Saints' Day in 1874.  However the consecration of the cemetery was not without controversy: the interdenominational character of the new cemetery – the different faith groups being interred on the same ground – met with fierce resistance, especially in conservative circles of the Roman Catholic Church.

This argument became even more aggressive when the city announced that it did not want an official Catholic opening of the new cemetery – but gave a substantial amount of money toward the construction of a segregated Jewish section. In the end, the groups reached an agreement resulting in the Catholic representatives opening the Central Cemetery with a small ceremony.  Due to refraining from having a large public showing, the new cemetery was inaugurated almost unnoticed in the early morning of 31 October 1874 by Vienna Mayor Baron Cajetan von Felder and Cardinal Joseph Othmar Rauscher to avoid an escalation of the public controversy. The official opening of the Central Cemetery occurred the following day. The first burial was that of Jacob Zelzer, followed by 15 others that day. The grave of Jacob Zelzer still exists near the administration building at the cemetery wall.

The cemetery spans  with 330,000 interments and up to 25 burials daily.

A Viennese joke has it that the Central Cemetery is "half the size of Zurich, but twice as much fun",.

Opposite the cemetery's main gate, across Simmeringer Hauptstrasse, is the Feuerhalle Simmering, Vienna's first crematorium, which was built by Clemens Holzmeister in 1922 in the style of an oriental fortress.

St. Charles Borromeo Cemetery Church is the central church of the cemetery. It used to be called Dr. Karl-Lueger-Gedächtniskirche (Karl Lueger Memorial Church) because of the crypt of the former mayor of Vienna below the high altar.  This church in Art Nouveau style was built in 1908–1910 by Max Hegele. The crypt of Austrian presidents is situated in front of the church.  The burial vault is located beneath the sarcophagus, with stairs leading down to a circular room whose walls are lined with niches where urns or coffins can be interred.

Ehrengräber

In its early incarnations, the cemetery was unpopular because of its distance from the city centre. This forced authorities to think of ways to make it more attractive: Hence honorary graves as a way of attracting tourists were established.

Interred in the Central Cemetery are notables such as Ludwig van Beethoven and Franz Schubert, who were moved to the Central Cemetery from "Währinger Ostfriedhof" in 1888; Johannes Brahms; Antonio Salieri; Johann Strauss II and Arnold Schoenberg. A cenotaph honours Wolfgang Amadeus Mozart, who is buried in nearby St. Marx Cemetery.

Interdenominational character
In addition to the Catholic section, the cemetery houses a Protestant cemetery (opened 1904) and two Jewish cemeteries.

Although the older of the two, established in 1863, was destroyed by the Nazis during the Kristallnacht, around 60,000 graves remain intact. Cemetery records indicate 79,833 Jewish burials as of 10 July 2011. Prominent burials here include those of the Rothschild family and that of the author Arthur Schnitzler. The second Jewish cemetery was built in 1917 and is still in use today. There were 58,804 Jewish burials in the new section as of 21 November 2007. Officials discovered the desecration of 43 Jewish graves in the two Jewish sections on 29 June 2012, allegedly as an anti-Semitic act – the stones and slabs were toppled or damaged.

Since 1876, Muslims have been buried at Vienna's Zentralfriedhof. The dead are buried according to Austrian law, in a coffin, in contrast to the Islamic ritual practice: burial in a shroud. The opening of the new Islamic cemetery of the Islamic Faith Community took place on 3 October 2008 in Liesing.

The cemetery also contains Russian Orthodox burial grounds (Saint Lazarus chapel, 1894) and plots dedicated for the use of various Eastern Orthodox churches. Since 1869, members of the Greek Orthodox community have been buried in Section 30 A, just west of Gate 2, near the arcades. The Romanian Orthodox community is near Gate 3 in Section 38 as are members of the Bulgarian Orthodox churches. The Serbian Orthodox community received portions of Sections 68 B and 69 C, near Gate 3. Section 27 A contains the tombs of the Coptic Orthodox Church.

The Protestant section on the east side is dedicated for the use of both confessions-parts of the Evangelical Protestant church in Austria, the Lutheran A.B (Evangelische Kirche Augsburger Bekenntnis) and Calvinist H.B (Evangelische Kirche Helvetisches Bekenntnis). The cemetery was inaugurated in the presence of the President of the Evangelical Protestant Church, Dr. Rudolf Franz on 14 November 1904. The cemetery was expanded in 1926, 1972 and 1998.  The Protestant section consists of 6,000 graves and 300 family vaults.

Europe's first Buddhist cemetery was established in the Vienna Central Cemetery in May 2005. An area of the Central Cemetery has been set aside for this purpose centered around a stupa, and was consecrated by a Tibetan monk.

The new Anatomy Memorial opened in Section 26, on 5 March 2009, for interments of the Institute of Anatomy of the Medical University of Vienna and for the people who donated their bodies to science.

The Church of Jesus Christ of Latter-day Saints in Austria celebrated the dedication of a hectare-sized plot set apart for the Mormon deceased in the Vienna Central Cemetery 19 September 2009.

Access 
Private car traffic is allowed on the cemetery grounds every day of the year except 1 November (All Saint's Day), although vehicles must pay a toll. Because of the large number of visitors on 1 November, private vehicles are not permitted. A public "cemetery bus" line (Route 106) operates on the grounds with several stops. The old Simmering horse tram was replaced by an electric tram, running from Schwarzenbergplatz to the Central Cemetery, in 1901 and it was renumbered as "71" (der 71er) in 1907; it remains the most popular route to the cemetery by public transport. The "Zentralfriedhof" stop on the Vienna S-Bahn (metro suburban railway) is close to the old Jewish part of the cemetery.

Gallery

Cultural references 
The cemetery is the scene of Harry Lime's fake and real funeral at the beginning and end of The Third Man. The musician Wolfgang Ambros credited the cemetery in his 1975 song Es lebe der Zentralfriedhof ("Long live the Central Cemetery"), marking with it the 100th anniversary of its opening.

Notable interments

 Alfred Adler (1870–1937), psychiatrist and psychologist, founder of individual psychology
 Wolf Albach-Retty (1906–1967), Austrian actor
 Rudolf von Alt (1812–1905), painter
 Alois Ander (1821–1864), Bohemian-born operatic tenor
 Franz Antel (1913–2007), film director, writer and producer
 Leon Askin (1907–2005), actor
 Franz von Bayros (1866–1924), artist
 Ludwig van Beethoven (1770–1827), composer
 Erna Berger (1900–1990), opera singer
 Ulrich Bettac (1897–1959), actor
 Hedy Bienenfeld (1907–1976), Austrian-American Olympic swimmer
 Theodor Billroth (1829–1894), surgeon
 Ludwig Boltzmann (1844–1906), physicist/mathematician
 Eugen von Böhm-Bawerk (1851–1914), Austrian economist
 Sergei Bortkiewicz (1877–1952), composer, with his wife Elisabeth
 Johannes Brahms (1833–1897), composer
 Adolf von Brudermann (1854–1945), Austro-Hungarian general
 Rudolf von Brudermann (1851–1941), Austro-Hungarian general
 Ignaz Brüll (1846–1907), composer
 Carl Czerny (1791–1857), piano teacher and composer
 Elfi von Dassanowsky (1924–2007), singer and film producer
 Georg Decker (1818–1894), portrait artist
 Karl Decker (1921-2005), Austrian football player and manager
 Otto Erich Deutsch (1883–1967), musicologist
 Heinrich Elbogen (1872–1927), Austrian sports shooter who competed in the 1912 Summer Olympics
 Falco civil name Johann (Hans) Hölzel (1957–1998), rock singer
 Anton Dominik Fernkorn (1813–1878), sculptor
 Leopold Figl (1902–1965), statesman
 Viktor Frankl (1905–1997), neurologist, psychiatrist, and Holocaust survivor
 Egon Friedell (1878–1938), Austrian philosopher, historian, journalist, actor, cabaret performer, and theatre critic
 Edgar Froese (1944–2015), musician, artist, composer
 Dorothea Gerard (1855–1915), novelist
 Carl von Ghega (1802–1860), engineer
 Alexander Girardi (1850–1918), actor
 Christoph Willibald Gluck (1714–1787), composer
 Karl Goldmark (1830–1915), composer
 Alfred Grünfeld (1852–1924), pianist
 Cecil van Haanen (1844–1914), artist
 Baron Theophil von Hansen (1813–1891), architect
 Anton Heiller (1923–1979), organist and composer
 Johann von Herbeck (1831–1877), composer
 Hysni Curri (?–1925), Albanian revolutionary
 Gert Jonke (1946–2009), poet, playwright and novelist
 Curd Jürgens (1912–1982), actor
 Emmerich Kálmán (1882–1953), composer
 Vera Karalli (1889–1972), ballerina and actress
 Siavash Kasrai (1927–1996), Persian Marxist poet
 Wilhelm Kienzl (1857–1941), composer
 Thomas Klestil (1932–2004), Austrian president (1992–2004)
 Bruno Kreisky (1911–1990), statesman
 Karl Kraus (1874–1936), writer
 Werner Johannes Krauss (1884–1959), stage and film actor
 Hedy Lamarr (1914–2000), actress and inventor
 Joseph Lanner (1801–1843), composer
 Lotte Lehmann (1888–1976), opera singer
 György Ligeti (1923–2006), composer
 Theo Lingen (1903–1978), actor/director
 Emanuel List (1888–1967), opera singer
 Guido von List (1848–1919) 19th-century mystic Germanic and Runic revivalist
 Adolf Loos (1870–1933), architect
 Max Lorenz (1901–1975), German tenor
 Luigi Lucheni (1873–1910), Italian assassin
 Karl Lueger (1844–1910), politician
 Julius Madritsch (1906–1984), Austrian Righteous Among the Nations
 Hans Moser (1880–1964), actor
 Siegfried Marcus (1831–1898), automobile pioneer
 Karl Millöcker (1842–1899), composer
 Karl Eugen Neumann (1865–1915), European pioneer of Buddhism
 Walter Nowotny (1920–1944), World War II Luftwaffe pilot
 Georg Wilhelm Pabst (1885–1967), film director
 Ida Laura Pfeiffer (1797-1858), explorer
 Hans Pfitzner (1869–1949), composer
 Clemens von Pirquet (1874–1929), scientist and pediatrician
 Paula von Preradović (1887–1951), writer
 Helmut Qualtinger (1928–1986), actor
 Julius Raab (1891–1964), statesman
 Geli Raubal (1908–1931), Adolf Hitler's half-niece
 Karl Renner (1870–1950), statesman
 Richard Réti (1889–1929), chess grandmaster
 Josef Karl Richter (1880–1933), composer
 Hans Riemer, politician
 Albert Salomon von Rothschild (1844–1911), financier
 Helen Scheu-Riesz (1880–1970), publisher, women's rights and peace activist
 Nathaniel Mayer Anselm von Rothschild (1836–1905), financier
 Léonie Rysanek (1926–1998), opera singer
 Antonio Salieri (1750–1825), composer
 Friedrich Schilcher (1811–1881), painter
 Franz Schmidt (1874–1939), composer
 Arthur Schnitzler (1862–1931), writer
 Arnold Schoenberg (1874–1951), composer
 Franz Schubert (1797–1828), composer
 Margarete Schütte-Lihotzky (1897–2000), architect
 David Schwarz (1852–1897) aviation pioneer
 Alma Seidler (1899–1977), actress
 Ignaz Seipel (1876–1932), statesman, Austrian chancellor
 Matthias Sindelar (1903–1939), footballer
 Robert Stolz (1880–1975), composer
 Eduard Strauss (1835–1916), composer
 Johann Strauss I (1804–1849), composer
 Johann Strauss II (1825–1899), composer
 Josef Strauss (1827–1870), composer
 Franz von Suppé (1819–1895), composer
 Heinrich Schenker (1868–1935), music theorist
 Friedrich Torberg (1908–1979), writer
 Kurt Waldheim (1918–2007), U.N secretary-general, Austrian president
 Franz Werfel (1890–1945), poet
 Franz West (1947–2012), artist
 Anton Wildgans (1881–1932), poet
 Hugo Wolf (1860–1903), composer
 Fritz Wotruba (1907–1975), sculptor
 Joe Zawinul (1932–2007), jazz keyboardist and composer
 Alexander von Zemlinsky (1871–1942), composer

References

External links
 
 
 

 
 
Buddhist cemeteries
1863 establishments in the Austrian Empire
Burial sites of the Petrović-Njegoš dynasty
19th-century architecture in Austria